Dr. Sanda Rašković Ivić (born 8 January 1956) is a Serbian psychiatrist, psychotherapist and politician. From 2014 to 2016, she was the president of the Democratic Party of Serbia. She was commissioner for refugees, the president of Coordination Center for Kosovo and Metohija, Serbian ambassador to Italy and a member of the Serbian Parliament.

In October 2017 she joined newly formed Vuk Jeremić's centre-right People's Party.

Biography
She is a daughter of doctors Jovan Rašković and Tanja Stipišić. She is of paternal Croatian Serb descent, and maternal Croat and Italian descent. She finished primary and high school in Šibenik and the School of Medicine of the University of Zagreb in 1980. She passed her examination for psychiatrist in 1986. Sanda is the author of many technical papers of psychiatry and psychotherapy.

References

External links

Democratic Party of Serbia - Official website

1956 births
Living people
Physicians from Zagreb
Democratic Party of Serbia politicians
21st-century Serbian women politicians
21st-century Serbian politicians
Serbian psychiatrists
School of Medicine, University of Zagreb alumni
Serbian nationalists
Women psychiatrists
Croatian emigrants to Serbia
Members of the National Assembly (Serbia)
Politicians from Zagreb
Serbian people of Croatian descent
Serbian people of Italian descent
Croatian people of Serbian descent
Croatian people of Italian descent
Women members of the National Assembly (Serbia)